The Traveling Salesman is a 1921 American comedy film starring Fatty Arbuckle. It is based on a 1908 play, The Traveling Salesman, by James Grant Forbes. A 1916 film adaptation of the play starred Frank McIntyre, who had also starred in the play. A print of The Traveling Salesman with German intertitles survives at the George Eastman House.

Plot

As described in a film publication, Bob Blake (Arbuckle), a travelling salesman, is the victim of a practical joke and gets off the train before his intended destination of Grand River. Bob is drenched in the pouring rain and, when he cannot find lodging, breaks into a private house that the sheriff is going to sell for a tax delinquency. The house belongs to Beth Elliott (Clarke), a telegraph operator at Grand River Station. Bob looks her up so he can pay for his lodging and falls in love with her. Franklin Royce (Holland), also in love with Beth, is jealous of Bob and accepts a proposition from Martin Drury (Taylor) to trick Beth out of the proceeds of the tax sale. In the end, Bob saves the house and wins the girl.

Cast
 Roscoe 'Fatty' Arbuckle as Bob Blake
 Betty Ross Clarke as Beth Elliott
 Frank Holland as Franklin Royce
 Wilton Taylor as Martin Drury
 Lucille Ward as Mrs. Babbitt
 Jim Blackwell as Julius
 Richard Wayne as Ted Watts
 George C. Pearce as John Kimball (as George Pearce)
 Robert Dudley as Pierce Gill

Production

The railroad scenes were filmed on the Sierra Railroad in Tuolumne County, California.

See also
 Fatty Arbuckle filmography

References

External links

1921 comedy films
1921 films
American black-and-white films
Silent American comedy films
American films based on plays
American silent feature films
Films based on works by Canadian writers
Films directed by Joseph Henabery
1920s American films
Films about salespeople